What Is to Be Done? (lit. 'What to Do?') is an 1863 novel written by Russian philosopher, journalist, and literary critic Nikolay Chernyshevsky, written in response to Fathers and Sons (1862) by Ivan Turgenev. The chief character is Vera Pavlovna, a woman who escapes the control of her family and an arranged marriage to seek economic independence.

Background
When he wrote the novel, Chernyshevsky was himself imprisoned in the Peter and Paul fortress of St. Petersburg and was to spend years in Siberia. He asked and received permission to write the novel in prison; the authorities passed the manuscript along to the newspaper Sovremennik, his former employer which also approved it for publication in installments in its pages.

Plot 
What Is to Be Done? begins with an unknown man checking into a hotel asking for a meal, a bed, and to be awakened in the morning. He then locks the door and is not heard for the rest of the night. The waiter knocks on the man's door the following day to wake him but gets no response and eventually contacts the police. The policeman finally forces through the door only to find a room empty except for a note linking the man to Liteyny Bridge. The police inform the butler that at that bridge, at half past two that morning, a lone gunshot was heard, and it was thought to be a suicide. But no dead body could be found, leading some to conclude it was a suicide, others a drunkard, and others a practical joker. Next, we skip to a scene where the protagonist to-be Vera Pavlovna is preparing her maid a dress to wear to Vera's wedding. The maid, Macha, presents her with a letter that causes her to become upset and irate. She then gets into a fight with her fiancé and tells him to leave.

The novel in the main revolves around the life of Vera Rozalsky. It begins in the year 1852 with Vera living with her tyrannical mother, scheming father, and young brother. Vera's parents intend to marry her to a hedonistic young military officer. She is saved from this fate when she meets the medical student, Dmitry Lopukhov, who has been tutoring her younger brother. Lopukhov and Vera began meeting privately to avoid her mother's suspicion and to discuss Socialism, gender equality, science, and ways to save her from the arranged marriage. Over time they grow feelings for one another, and because of this and of Lopukhov's desire to save her, they secretly elope and move in together.

Vera and Lopukhov intend to live in accordance with their beliefs and draw up a system of elaborate rules, such as not being able to enter each other's sleeping quarters without express permission, so as to give each other the utmost equality, privacy, freedom, and independence. Vera aspires not only to have economic independence for herself but also to save other young women from the fate she almost faced. She becomes a seamstress and starts a commune of seamstresses with other young women, many of whose stories are related in the novel. The commune evolves to include shared living arrangements, profit-sharing, and classes provided by educated individuals such as Lopukhov and his best friend and classmate Alexander Kirsanov.

The commune thrives, leading to a second becoming established. But in the meantime, Kirsanov has fallen in love with Vera, and she has come to realize that she does not love Lopukhov as much as she thought she did. Lopukhov, whose ardour for his wife remains undimmed, recognises this too and tries to manipulate events in the background before eventually discussing the problem with a distraught Vera. In secret, Lopukhov disappears and fakes his own suicide, as described in the preface. This leaves Kirsanov and Vera free to marry one another. Eventually, the famed Rakhmetov character reveals to Vera the ruse that is the faked suicide. Though satisfied with her work with the seamstress commune, Vera begins to study medicine to become a doctor and break the public prejudice against women joining such a profession.

The book's final section focuses on Kirsanov and the patient he is treating. This young woman is suffering partly because of a lack of freedom to marry as she pleases. Kirsanov not only solves this problem but helps her to realize that the man she wishes to marry is a licentious and lackluster partner. The woman eventually meets and falls in love with Charles Beaumont, a man who claims to have been an American industrialist partially raised in Russia. Charles steers the young woman towards Vera's circle, which she quickly joins. Finally, Charles and the woman marry. Vera meets Charles for the first time and realizes that Charles is Lopukhov returned from the U.S. And the Kirsanovs and "Beaumonts" eventually move in together in a ménage à quatre.

Utopianism in the novel 
The novel advocates the creation of small socialist cooperatives based on the Russian peasant commune, but ones that are oriented toward industrial production. The author promoted the idea that the intellectual's duty was to educate and lead the laboring masses in Russia along a path to socialism that bypassed capitalism. Despite his minor role, Rakhmetov, one of the characters in the novel, became an emblem of the philosophical materialism and nobility of Russian radicalism. Through one character's dream, the novel also expresses a society gaining "eternal joy" of an earthly kind.

The work itself can be analyzed as a work of literary utopia through its alternating narrative style, wherein Chernyshevsky makes use of metaliterary techniques that implicate the reader through the author's interruptions and direct addresses to the reader. The reader's complicity with the author, who is presumably the narrator, further implicates them in the political act of engaging with Chernyshevsky's ideology.

Vera Pavlovna's dreams 
Vera Pavlovna has four dreams throughout the course of the novel. Vera's dreams ultimately work to transform her own desires into action. Vera Pavlovna's dreams follow in the Russian literary tradition of the prophetic dream, having a predictive relationship from sleep to waking life.

In her first dream, Vera's "dream-guide" (a version of herself) introduces herself as "the bride of your [Vera's] bridegroom," solidifying Vera's intention to marry Lopukhov and free herself from her cellar. In her dream, Vera continues to free other young girls from their own cellars. Vera does so in real life by forming her sewing co-operative and residential commune that affords both herself and other young girls the ability to become financially independent and self-sufficient.

Vera Pavlovna witnesses a theoretical conversation between Lopukhov and Kirsanov about the philosophical constituents of dirt in her second dream. While this dream does not appear to directly spur Vera into revolutionary action, the conversation is an allegory for Chernyshevsky's belief that socioeconomic conditions shape individuals. Wagner says of this dream:"Chernyshevsky uses Liebig's theories regarding the fertility of different types of soil... to expound his own idea that socioeconomic conditions shape an individual's character, and that therefore the revolutionary transformation of these conditions will ensure social justice and prosperity by fostering appropriate personality traits."Vera Pavlovna's third dream exposes her doubts within her marriage to Lopukhov, forming the foundation for Vera's formation of a variety of relationships later in the novel that do not conform to the monogamous and heterosexual social norms.

Ultimately, Vera's fourth dream constructs an agrarian utopia. Vera sees a crystal palace that is a technological and scientific marvel. The utopia in Vera's dream is reminiscent of Charles Fourier's phalanstères. Vera's dream-guide champions equal rights between all women and men as the foundation for this utopian society. It is here that Vera recognizes herself as her dream-guide, thus positioning utopian potential in the everyday through such actions and ideologies as Vera Pavlovna's.

Influence 
More than the novel itself, the book is perhaps best known in the English-speaking world for the response it garnered.

The novel inspired several generations of revolutionaries in Russia, including populists, nihilists, and Marxists. Likewise, Vladimir Lenin, Georgi Plekhanov, Peter Kropotkin, Alexandra Kollontay, Rosa Luxemburg, and Swedish writer August Strindberg were all highly impressed with the book. Emma Goldman, a Russian-born anarchist, describes her intent to found a sewing cooperative based on Vera Pavlovna's model found in the novel.

The novel came to be officially regarded as a Russian classic in the Soviet period, as Chernyshevsky was celebrated as a forefather of the revolution. According to Joseph Frank, "Chernyshevsky's novel, far more than Marx's Capital, supplied the emotional dynamic that eventually went to make the Russian Revolution."

The novel was controversial upon its publishing and continues to be. Fyodor Dostoevsky mocked the utilitarianism and utopianism of the novel in his 1864 novella Notes from Underground, as well as in his 1872 novel Demons, as did Vladimir Nabokov in his final novel in Russian, The Gift. Leo Tolstoy wrote his own What Is to Be Done?, published in 1886, based on his own ideas of moral responsibility. Vladimir Lenin named his 1902 pamphlet What Is to Be Done? due to the influence the novel had on him.

The novel's influence spread beyond the Russian radical tradition and Russian radical intellectuals. For example, it is referenced by Tony Kushner multiple times in his play Slavs!, by André Gide's Les caves du Vatican (Lafcadio's Adventures), and, some have argued, by Ayn Rand.

References

Further reading 

 Mack, Maynard. 1956. The Norton Anthology of World Masterpieces. pp. 1,085–1,086.

External links 
 What Is to Be Done?. Russian text.
 What Is to Be Done?. 1886 English translation.

Novels by Nikolai Chernyshevsky
1863 Russian novels
Russian political novels
Russian philosophical novels